The 34th District of the Iowa House of Representatives in the state of Iowa.

Current elected officials
Bruce Hunter is the representative currently representing the district.

Past representatives
The district has previously been represented by:
 Larry N. Larson, 1971–1973
 Stephen Rapp, 1973–1975
 M. Peter Middleton, 1975–1977
 Albert L. Garrison, 1977–1979
 Stephen Rapp, 1979–1983
 David M. Tabor, 1983–1991
 Rick Dickinson, 1991–1995
 Jerry E. Cornelius, 1995–1995
 Robert Osterhaus, 1995–2003
 Todd Taylor, 2003–2013
 Bruce Hunter, 2013–present

References

034